Puss may refer to:

Arts, entertainment, and media
 Puss (magazine), Swedish magazine published between 1968 and 1973
 Puss (film), a Swedish film dated 2010
 "Puss" (song), a noise rock song dated 1992
 Tom Puss, a fictional anthropomorphic cat

Other uses
 Puss Milroy (1887–1916), Scottish rugby union player
 Puss, face or facial expression, as in sour puss

 Puss or pussycat, a slang term for the domestic cat

See also
 Pus (disambiguation)
 Pussy (disambiguation)
 Puss in Boots (disambiguation)
 Puss Moth (disambiguation)